The AEW World Trios Championship is a professional wrestling world tag team championship created and promoted by the American promotion All Elite Wrestling (AEW). It is a specialized tag team championship, being contested by teams of three wrestlers, referred to as trios. Established on July 27, 2022, the inaugural champions were The Elite (Kenny Omega, Matt Jackson, and Nick Jackson). The current champions are The House of Black (Malakai Black, Brody King, and Buddy Matthews), who are in their first reign, both as a team and individually.

History

On the July 27, 2022, special episode of Dynamite titled Fight for the Fallen, All Elite Wrestling (AEW) announced a tournament for the inaugural AEW World Trios Championship, which would culminate at the All Out pay-per-view on September 4, 2022. Unlike the AEW World Tag Team Championship, which is a standard tag team title contested by teams of two wrestlers, the Trios Championship is contested by teams of three wrestlers, referred to as trios. At All Out, The Elite (Kenny Omega, Matt Jackson, and Nick Jackson) defeated "Hangman" Adam Page and The Dark Order (Alex Reynolds and John Silver) in the tournament final to become the inaugural champions.

Following berating comments made by AEW World Champion CM Punk at the All Out post-event media scrum on September 5, a legitimate physical altercation occurred between Punk and The Elite. As a result, AEW president Tony Khan suspended all involved. On the September 7 episode of Dynamite, Khan announced that both the World Championship and Trios Championship were vacated. Khan then announced that the episode's scheduled six-man tag team match between Death Triangle (Pac, Penta El Zero M, and Rey Fénix) and Best Friends (Chuck Taylor, Trent Beretta, and Orange Cassidy) would be for the vacant Trios Championship, which was won by Death Triangle.

Inaugural tournament

Reigns
The Elite (Kenny Omega, Matt Jackson, and Nick Jackson) were the inaugural champions. Their inaugural reign was also the shortest at 3 days while Death Triangle's (Pac, Penta El Zero M, and Rey Fénix) sole reign is the longest at 126 days. Omega is the oldest champion, winning the title for a second time at 39, while Fénix is the youngest at 31.

The current champions are The House of Black (Malakai Black, Brody King, and Buddy Matthews), who are in their first reign, both as a team and individually. They defeated The Elite (Kenny Omega, Matt Jackson, and Nick Jackson) on March 5, 2023, at Revolution in San Francisco, California.

Combined reigns

By team

By wrestler

Notes

References

External links 
 Official AEW World Trios Championship History at All Elite Wrestling

All Elite Wrestling championships
Trios wrestling tag team championships
World professional wrestling championships
2022 introductions
2022 establishments in the United States